WQPH (89.3 FM) is a Catholic radio station, licensed to Shirley, Massachusetts, United States and serving the Fitchburg area. The station is owned by Prayers for Life, Inc., and is an affiliate of EWTN Radio.

References

External links

Catholic radio stations
Radio stations established in 2012
2012 establishments in Massachusetts
Shirley, Massachusetts
Mass media in Middlesex County, Massachusetts
QPH
Catholic Church in Massachusetts